IWR may be:   

 Interactive Web Response, similar to Interactive Voice Response (IVR)
 Intelligent word recognition
 Iraq Resolution or Iraq War Resolution, enacted by the United States in 2002
 Information World Review, an information industry trade newspaper
 iShares Russell Midcap (ticker symbol IWR), an exchange-traded fund of U.S. stocks
 Institute for Water Resources, part of the United States Army Corps of Engineers
 Isle of Wight Railway
 In-water recompression, a treatment for decompression sickness
 Independent Wrestling Revolution, a company that promotes professional wrestling
 The Interdisciplinary Center for Scientific Computing (in German: Interdisziplinäres Zentrum für wissenschaftliches Rechnen, short IWR), a scientific research institute of the University of Heidelberg, Germany.